The first series of China's Got Talent, also known as Head & Shoulders China's Got Talent for sponsor reasons, premiered on DragonTV on July 25, 2010. The premiere ratings drew 400 million viewers. Dongfang Daily reported that with an 8 percent audience share in Shanghai while in 26 other provinces got a 1.37 percent share. The second episode increased 100 million viewers from the premiere which makes it 500 million viewers who watched. This makes China's Got Talent the most viewers in the Got Talent franchise history.

Auditions
The auditions for the first series of China's Got Talent were pre-selected by the producers of the show from preliminary auditions. The auditions were held in Shanghai Concert Hall from July 25 to September 5. In China's version of Got Talent franchise, judges pressing 'X' does not always mean that they do not like the contestant's performance. It is a way to stop the performance as judges has heard enough and are satisfied.

{| class="wikitable collapsible collapsed" style="width: 98%"
! style="text-align: center"| Audition 3 (August 8, 2010)
|-
|
 Advanced
Bai Dengchun, cards slicing  (clips broadcast in Audition 1) [13:15]
Dennis, male pole dancer (from Uzbekistan)  [16:48]
D-ancers Generation, dancers  [22:25]
Wang Cong and Li Wenbo, impressionists  [28:32]
Qian Chen, dance troupe  [31:55]
Fan Yuancheng, beat boxer  [32:24]
Zhang Zhenghui, pumping air by nose,  [34:04]
Zhou Yanfeng , pig act,  [36:05]
Lu Tong, yodeling,  [43:50]
Shao Meiling, magician,  [47:46]
Power, acrobats,  [50:48]
Eastern Production, Ninja and Bunnies Act,  [56:29]
Liu Wei, disabled pianist,  [59:04]

Rejected
TOP ONE, Three Ostrich Act,  [9:51]
ECNU Cheerleaders, Cheerleading troupe,  [11:56]
Liu Yunji, jumping rope,  [12:12]
Wang Yanlong, muay thai,  [12:23]
Zhao Yingqiu, chopping stones with hand,  [12:32]
Zhang Jiaqi, eyebrow act,  [32:42]
Ge Wang, snapping fingers,  [33:01]
Xiong Bingsen, variety act,  [33:15]
Wang Yongsheng, screamer,  [33:41]
Gong Yucong, singer,  [55:04]
Shen Ma, ball room dancers,  [55:30]
Yin Mengni, dog act,  [56:11]
Mao Rongrong, Singing/balancing,  [56:48]
|}

Semifinals
The semifinals began on September 12, 2010.

Rules
A media jury are involved. After jury's vote are all counted, each of three judges has a chance of giving 10 votes to one contestant. The contestant who gets the most votes advances to the final. Another final contestant will be decided between 2nd and 3rd place by judge's choice.

Two most popular contestants eliminated in semifinals can advance via online ballots after all 3 semifinals are broadcast.

Therefore, the final chart will be filled with two winners from each semifinal and two popular contestants.

Week 1 (September 12, 2010)

Week 2 (September 19, 2010)

Week 3 (September 26, 2010)

Popular Vote
Voting starts on September 27 and ends on October 3. Among 18 contestants eliminated in Semifinals, two can advance to the Final via popular votes.

Final
Final was broadcast on 10 October and Liu Wei was the winner. Also a finale concert including Britain's Got Talents contestants: Paul Potts,Part II: https://www.youtube.com/watch?v=YB6Z1c67jtA Escala, Diversity, and Signature and America's Got Talent contestant Recycled Percussion.

Final standing was decided by SMS votes started from 4 Oct and ended with the live broadcast. However, details about total votes or percentages have not been released yet.

Series 1 Round Summary (Top 24)Italics'' indicate the act was selected by the online public voting as their top 2 favorites.

References

External links
China's Got Talent (En: ChinasGotTalent.org)

Footnotes

2010 Chinese television seasons
China's Got Talent
2010 Chinese television series debuts